is a Japanese bobsledder who has competed since 2004. Competing in two Winter Olympics, he earned his best finish of 21st in both the two-man and four-man events at Vancouver in 2010.

Kobayashi's best finish at the FIBT World Championships was 19th in the four-man event at Lake Placid, New York in 2009. His best World Cup finish was 21st in a four-man event at St. Moritz in January 2010.

References

Sports-Reference.com profile

1976 births
Bobsledders at the 2006 Winter Olympics
Bobsledders at the 2010 Winter Olympics
Japanese male bobsledders
Living people
Olympic bobsledders of Japan
21st-century Japanese people